The 2016 F4 Chinese Championship season (Shell Cup FIA F4 Chinese Championship) was the second season of the F4 Chinese Championship. It began on 23 April at the Zhuhai International Circuit and finished on 6 November at the Guangdong International Circuit after five triple-header rounds, all of them co-hosted with the China Formula Grand Prix championship.

Teams and drivers

Race calendar and results
A five–round provisional calendar was revealed on 31 December 2015. All rounds were held in China and, as opposed to the previous season, was not be spread over two years. The calendar was slightly revised on 10 March. A later update changed the venue of the season finale from Guangdong to Zhuhai.

Championship standings
Points were awarded as follows:

Drivers' Championship

References

External links 

  

F4 Chinese Championship seasons
Chinese
F4 Championship
Chinese F4